Walter Morgan  was a Welsh Anglican priest.

Morgan was educated at Jesus College, Oxford. He was Archdeacon of St Davids from 10 February 1731 until his death on 28 February 1732.

References

Alumni of Jesus College, Oxford
Archdeacons of St Davids
18th-century Welsh people
18th-century Welsh Anglican priests
1732 deaths